The Big 12 Conference Softball Pitcher of the Year is a college softball award given to the Big 12 Conference's most outstanding pitcher. The award was first given following the 2002 season. Cat Osterman and Paige Parker have won the award a record four times each.

Key

Winners

Winners by school

References

Awards established in 2002 
Player
NCAA Division I softball conference players of the year